Rhinella vellardi, the Alto Marañon toad, is a species of toad in the family Bufonidae that is endemic to Peru. It is only known from the type locality in the upper Marañón area, Cajamarca Region of northern Peru. Its natural habitat is montane forest in the upper Amazon basin. It is a rare species of which little is known.

References

vellardi
Amphibians described in 1978
Amphibians of Peru
Endemic fauna of Peru
Taxonomy articles created by Polbot